The 2010–11 Biathlon World Cup - World Cup 1 was the opening event of the season and was held in Östersund, Sweden, from 1 December until 5 December 2010.

Schedule of events 
The time schedule of the event stands below

Medal winners

Men

Women

Achievements

 Best performance for all time

 , 18th place in Individual
 , 35th place in Individual
 , 39th place in Individual and 33rd in Pursuit
 , 40th place in Individual
 , 46th place in Individual
 , 95th place in Individual
 , 10th place in Sprint and 7th place in Pursuit
 , 68 place in Sprint
 , 86th place in Sprint
 , 91st place in Sprint
 , 14th place in Individual
 , 25th place in Individual
 , 30th place in Individual
 , 32nd place in Individual
 , 37th place in Individual and 35th place in Sprint
 , 39th place in Individual, 2nd place in Sprint and Pursuit
 , 42nd place in Individual
 , 62nd place in Individual
 , 24th place in Sprint
 , 41st place in Sprint
 , 74th place in Sprint
 , 12th place in Pursuit

 First World Cup race

 , 61st place in Individual
 , 93rd place in Individual
 , 42nd place in Individual
 , 44th place in Individual
 , 45th place in Individual
 , 53rd place in Individual
 , 79th place in Individual
 , 85th place in Individual
 , 90th place in Individual
 , 61st place in Sprint

References 

- World Cup 1, 2010-11 Biathlon World Cup
Biathlon World Cup - World Cup 1, 2010-11
December 2010 sports events in Europe
Sports competitions in Östersund
Sports competitions in Sweden